Saint Gordianus (commemorated 13 September), who with several companions was martyred in Pontus or Galatia.

References

Christian martyrs